The Engel Peaks are a group of three peaks, the highest at , extending in a northwest–southeast direction for , standing  west of Cape Rymill on the east side of Palmer Land. This feature was photographed from the air in 1928 by Sir Hubert Wilkins, and again in 1940 by members of the United States Antarctic Service who also sledge surveyed along this coast. The peaks were resighted by the Ronne Antarctic Research Expedition, 1947–48, under Finn Ronne, who named them for Bud Engel, president of the Albert Richard Division of the Osterman Company, Milwaukee, Wisconsin, who contributed garments suitable for winter use to the expedition.

References 

Mountains of Palmer Land